Sisaket Hospital is the main hospital of Sisaket Province, Thailand. It is classified under the Ministry of Public Health as a regional hospital. It has a CPIRD Medical Education Center which trains doctors for the College of Medicine and Public Health of Ubon Ratchathani University.

History 
Khukhan Health Station was opened in 1908 to serve the citizens of Khukhan Province (the former name of Sisaket Province). It was refurbished in 1934. In 1938, Khukhan Province was renamed Sisaket Province and the health station was therefore renamed Sisaket Health Station. The hospital was further expanded during the First Indochina War and World War II as a military base was established in the area. On 1 December 1948, the health station was officially elevated to hospital level and renamed Sisaket Hospital. In 1998, the hospital made an agreement to train medical students and act as a clinical teaching hospital for the College of Medicine and Public Health, Ubon Ratchathani University under the Collaborative Project to Increase Production of Rural Doctors (CPIRD) program.

See also 

 Healthcare in Thailand
 Hospitals in Thailand
 List of hospitals in Thailand

References 

 Article incorporates material from the corresponding article in the Thai Wikipedia.

Hospitals in Thailand
Sisaket province